Monteagudo de las Salinas is a municipality in Cuenca Province, Castile-La Mancha, Spain.

It has a population of 133.

Municipalities in the Province of Cuenca